The Chronicle of King Henry VIII. of England, commonly known as the Spanish Chronicle is a chronicle written during the reigns of Henry VIII and Edward VI by an unknown author.

The chronicle was translated from Spanish and published with notes in 1889, by the respected historian, Martin Hume. Hume appears to have regarded the work as an authentic contemporary document from the 16th century that related an eyewitness' account of various events in the Tudor period. Alison Weir, in The Six Wives of Henry VIII, notes that the Spanish Chronicle is "notoriously inaccurate".

Notes

References 

 
  at Internet Archive

External links
 Chronicle of King Henry VIII (The Spanish Chronicle)
 The 'Spanish' Chronicle

English chronicles
Tudor England
History books about England
Works of unknown authorship